The 2019 Phoenix Rising FC season is the club's sixth season in the USL Championship and their third as Rising FC. They are the defending Western Conference Champions.

Competitions

Friendlies

USL Championship 

All times from this point on Mountain Standard Time (UTC-07:00)

Results summary

League results

USL Championship Playoffs

Conference Playoffs

Western Conference standings

U.S. Open Cup

As a member of the USL Championship, Phoenix Rising entered the tournament proper in the Second Round.

Statistics
(regular-season & Playoffs)

One Own Goal scored by Orange County SC, OKC Energy FC, Sacramento Republic FC

Goalkeepers

Transfers

Loan in

Loan out

See also 
 2019 in American soccer
 2019 USL Championship season
 Phoenix Rising FC
 Casino Arizona Field

References 

2019
Phoenix Rising FC
Phoenix Rising FC
2010s in Phoenix, Arizona
Phoenix Rising FC